Eugen Gomringer (born 20 January 1925 in Cachuela Esperanza, Bolivia) is a Bolivian-born German concrete poet. He is head of the Institut für Konstruktive Kunst und Konkrete Poesie (IKKP) in Rehau, Germany. Between 1977 and 1990, he was a professor at the Kunstakademie Düsseldorf, the Arts Academy of the city of Düsseldorf. Gomringer writes in German, Spanish, French and English.

References

External links 
 Archivio Conz
 

1925 births
Living people
Bolivian male poets
Bolivian people of Swiss descent
People from Vaca Díez Province
Signalism
Members of the Academy of Arts, Berlin
German poets
German male poets
Bolivian emigrants to Germany